Harvey H. Cluff (October 24, 1872 – January 1, 1949) was an American politician who served as the Attorney General of Utah from 1921 to 1929.

References

1872 births
1949 deaths
Utah Attorneys General
Utah Republicans